Brucoli Lighthouse is an active lighthouse located in the municipality of Augusta on the eastern coast of Sicily near the southern end of the Gulf of Catania. The lighthouse is also called Faro Antico Castello Regina Giovanna (Queen Juana Acient Castle Lighthouse), because of its proximity to the castle of Brucoli, built in 15th century by Juana Enriquez, second wife of John II of Aragon.

Activated in 1911 and subsequently electrified, it consists of a white tower with a red band and an adjacent building.

In 2017 the Agenzia del Demanio leased the unused service building for 50 years to a local company, which converted it into an accommodation facility.

References

Lighthouses in Italy
Buildings and structures in the Province of Syracuse
Lighthouses completed in 1911